James Ellsworth Noland (April 22, 1920 – August 12, 1992) was a United States representative from Indiana and a United States district judge of the United States District Court for the Southern District of Indiana.

Education

Born in La Grange, Missouri, Noland received an Artium Baccalaureus degree from Indiana University Bloomington in 1942 and a Master of Business Administration from Harvard Graduate School of Business Administration in 1943. He was in the United States Army during World War II, from 1943 to 1946. He received a Juris Doctor from Indiana University Maurer School of Law in 1948.

Career

Noland was an unsuccessful Democratic candidate for election to the Eightieth Congress from Indiana in 1946. He was in private practice in Bloomington, Indiana from 1948 to 1949. He was a United States representative from Indiana from 1949 to 1951. He ran unsuccessfully for reelection in 1950. He was in private practice in Indianapolis, Indiana from 1951 to 1966. During that time, he also served as an assistant state attorney general of Indiana in 1952, and as an Indiana state election commissioner in 1954. He was an assistant city attorney of Indianapolis in 1956, and a first assistant city attorney of Indianapolis from 1956 to 1957. He was a member of the Indiana State Election Board from 1958 to 1966.

Federal judicial service

On October 6, 1966, Noland was nominated by President Lyndon B. Johnson to a new seat on the United States District Court for the Southern District of Indiana created by 80 Stat. 75. He was confirmed by the United States Senate on October 20, 1966, and received his commission on November 3, 1966. He served as Chief Judge from 1984 to 1986, assuming senior status on December 31, 1986. He was a Judge of the Foreign Intelligence Surveillance Court from 1983 to 1990 and Presiding Judge of that court from 1988 to 1990. Noland remained in senior status until his death, on August 12, 1992, in Indianapolis. He was interred in that city's Crown Hill Cemetery.

References

Sources
 
 
 Biography of James Ellsworth Noland

1920 births
1992 deaths
20th-century American judges
20th-century American lawyers
20th-century American politicians
Burials at Crown Hill Cemetery
Democratic Party members of the United States House of Representatives from Indiana
Harvard Business School alumni
Indiana University Bloomington alumni
Judges of the United States District Court for the Southern District of Indiana
People from La Grange, Missouri
United States Army personnel of World War II
United States district court judges appointed by Lyndon B. Johnson
Judges of the United States Foreign Intelligence Surveillance Court